The ninth season of Australian reality television series The Block, titled The Block: Glasshouse, premiered on Sunday, 27 July 2014 at 6:30pm on the Nine Network. Scott Cam (host) and Shelley Craft (Challenge Master) returned from the previous season, as did the three judges: Neale Whitaker, Shaynna Blaze and Darren Palmer. It is the second season to have five couples appear on the show, instead of four.

The Glasshouse building is at 121-127 High Street Prahran, Melbourne. The building is double the size of the previous season's building, Dux House, and was the biggest block to date. For a first in any block season, not only do the judges vote on the contestants rooms, but the contestants judge each other's rooms. Shannon and Simon Vos were the eventual winners of the show with a $335,000 profit on a sale price of $1.9 million plus an additional $100,000 bonus prize.

Contestants

The Block: Glasshouse is the second season to have five couples instead of the traditional four couples.

Score history

Results

Room reveals

Judges' Scores
 Colour key:
  Highest Score
  Lowest Score

Challenge Apartment

Auction

Ratings

Ratings data is from OzTAM and represents the live and same day average viewership from the 5 largest Australian metropolitan centres (Sydney, Melbourne, Brisbane, Perth and Adelaide).

Notes
Aired in Melbourne, Adelaide and Perth
Aired in Sydney and Brisbane
Due to Thursday night football, the Thursday night episode airs on Wednesdays in Sydney and Brisbane recurring after Wednesday night episode, whereas in Melbourne, Adelaide and Perth air the Thursday night episode on the Thursday. 
Thursday night ratings only include Melbourne, Adelaide and Perth
Sunday night episode will air Monday night due to the Football Grand Final
The prize money that the team receives is taken off their reserve

References

2014 Australian television seasons
9